Austrophyllolepis is an extinct genus of phyllolepid arthrodire placoderm from Middle to Late Devonian freshwater strata of Australia.  The type species, A. ritchiei is found in Givetian to early Frasnian-aged freshwater strata near what is now Mount Howitt.  A second species, A. dulciensis, is found from Middle Devonian freshwater strata from the Dulcie Sandstone of Georgina Basin, Central Australia.

References
 A New Phyllolepid Placoderm Occurrence (Devonian Fish) from the Dulcie Sandstone, Georgina Basin, Central Australia.

Placoderms of Australia
Phyllolepids
Fossil taxa described in 1984